Arnott Street Railway Bridge (Petrov's Bridge) was a small, isolated railway bridge in Canberra, most famously used by soviet agent Vladimir Petrov in 1954 as a Dead drop location for the Australian Security Intelligence Organisation (ASIO). The bridge was used as part of the Bombala railway line before it was destroyed in 2018.

Petrov's Bridge also less commonly refers to the bridge Petrov revealed as a Soviet dead drop site, a different bridge along the Bombala railway line a few miles outside the Canberra railway station.

History 
Petrov's Bridge was built in 1887 as part of the Bombala railway line extension from Bungendore to Michelago. It was built to cross one of the few rural roads that existed in the area around Queanbeyan at the time. Its original wood and stone construction persisted its entire 131 years of existence.

Allegedly, during the 1950s a dark coloured car with tinted windows could regularly be seen near the bridge, as well as Petrov's Skoda on occasion.

During the 1970s Arnott Street was the main access road to the Tralee Speedway for the ACT.

In 1982 Hume was gazetted and the bridge became part of the new suburb.

By 1989 both freight and passenger service had ceased south of Queanbeyan, leaving the bridge unused.

In 2018 the bridge was demolished, with Transport NSW citing safety concerns over the low height of the bridge.

As a dead drop location 

During the 1950s Vladimir Petrov operated as the leader of the Soviet espionage efforts within their embassy in Canberra. In 1954, after the instability caused by the death of Joseph Stalin, Petrov made contact with ASIO and offered to provide evidence of the espionage efforts in exchange for political asylum. Over the next few months, ASIO and Petrov exchanged information and his escape plan through dead drops. The Arnott Street Railbridge was chosen as the dead drop location because of its isolation and abundance of hiding places.

Although the location of the bridge Petrov made his drops at was never officially disclosed, Petrov described the bridge in his testimony to the Royal Commission on Espionage as a railbridge located on the Queanbeyan rail line about "six and a half miles from Canberra". The only bridge fitting that description at the time was the Arnott Street Railway Bridge.

See also 
 Petrov Affair
 Vladimir Petrov (diplomat)

References 

Buildings and structures completed in 1887
Buildings and structures in Canberra
Demolished bridges in Australia